Trigonidium, abbreviated as Trgdm in horticultural trade, is a genus of orchids comprising roughly twenty species found from Mexico to Brazil.

Etymology

Trigonidium derives from the Greek "trigonon", meaning "triangle", in reference to the triangular shape of the flowers.

Description

The epiphytes and lithophytes of the genus have long or short rhizomes. Its pseudobulbs are cylindrical or ovoid with overlapping sheathes at their base and one or two leaves at their apex. The inflorescences of the genus are basal, erect, and single flowered, with the flower usually as long or longer than the leaves. The flowers are tubular at the base with sepals spreading. The sepals are larger than the petals and the petals are larger than the lip. The lip is trilobed and not spurred.

The flowers have shiny pads and eyespots that lure male bees to perform pseudocopulation with the blossoms.

Cultivation

Plants of the genus grow well in pots with standard epiphyte mix, in intermediate conditions with light shade and high humidity. Plants should be kept dry but not so dry that pseudobulbs shrivel.

References

External links 
Wikispecies entry for Trigonidium (Orchidaceae)
Wikimedia Commons links for Trigonidium (Orchidaceae)

Maxillarieae genera
Maxillariinae